Cirrochroa thais, also known as the Tamil yeoman, is a species of nymphalid butterfly found in forested areas of tropical Sri Lanka and India. It is the state insect of Tamil Nadu, an Indian state.

Description

Wingspan 60–75 mm.

Gallery

References

Vagrantini
Butterflies of Asia
Butterflies described in 1787